Also known as Angel Meadow, the Angel & Greyhound Meadow is a flood-meadow adjoining the River Cherwell just north of Magdalen Bridge, Oxford, England and opposite Magdalen College. It derives its name from the old Angel and Greyhound coaching inns in the High Street, for which it served as a horse-pasture. There is now a pub named the Angel & Greyhound in St Clement's, an interesting example of an inn named after a meadow named after two inns.

The park is very low-lying, and often partially or completely flooded during February and March.

References

Parks and open spaces in Oxford
Water-meadows
Grasslands of the United Kingdom